Franjo Prce (born 7 January 1996) is a Croatian professional footballer who plays as a defender for Slovenian PrvaLiga side Koper.

Club career
Born in Čapljina, Bosnia and Herzegovina, Prce started his career with the youth academy of Croatian club Hajduk Split. However, after the club's reluctance to hand him a professional contract and instead use him in the B-team, he refused to sign a contract extension proposal. On 16 August 2014, he moved to Italian club Lazio for  300,000 and signed a professional contract. He featured 27 times for the Lazio Primavera during the 2014–15 season, with his team finishing runners-up to Torino in the Supercoppa Primavera. On 13 January 2016, he was loaned out to Salernitana.

On 23 October 2016, Prce made his first team debut for Lazio, replacing Felipe Anderson in a 2–2 draw against Torino in Serie A. On 12 January 2017, he joined Brescia on a loan deal till June 2018. After being used sparingly, he was recalled from his loan deal by his parent club.

On 31 January 2018, Prce moved to Croatian club Istra 1961 again on a loan deal. On 17 July 2018, he moved abroad and joined Cypriot club AC Omonia on a three-year contract. On 25 August, he made his debut, and also scored a goal in a 1–0 victory over Alki Oroklini.

On 15 September 2021, East Bengal announced that Prce had joined the Indian Super League club on a one-year deal. He made his debut on 21 November against Jamshedpur FC in a 1–1 draw.

International career
Prce was included in the Croatian under-17 team for the 2013 UEFA European Under-17 Championship. He also featured for the team in the 2013 FIFA under-17 World Cup. On 18 March 2017, he was called to the Croatian under-21 team for a friendly match against Slovenia.

Career statistics

References

External links
 

1996 births
Living people
People from Čapljina
Croats of Bosnia and Herzegovina
Association football defenders
Croatian footballers
Croatia youth international footballers
Croatia under-21 international footballers
S.S. Lazio players
U.S. Salernitana 1919 players
Brescia Calcio players
NK Istra 1961 players
AC Omonia players
FC Karpaty Lviv players
NK Varaždin (2012) players
NK Slaven Belupo players
East Bengal Club players
FC Koper players
Serie A players
Serie B players
Croatian Football League players
Cypriot First Division players
Indian Super League players
Slovenian PrvaLiga players
Croatian expatriate footballers
Croatian expatriate sportspeople in Italy
Expatriate footballers in Italy
Croatian expatriate sportspeople in Cyprus
Expatriate footballers in Cyprus
Croatian expatriate sportspeople in Ukraine
Expatriate footballers in Ukraine
Croatian expatriate sportspeople in India
Expatriate footballers in India
Croatian expatriate sportspeople in Slovenia
Expatriate footballers in Slovenia